Thungathurthy is a village in Suryapet district of the Indian state of Telangana. It is located in Thungathurthy mandal of Suryapet Revenue Division. It is about 42km from the district headquarters Suryapet.

References

Villages in Suryapet district
Mandal headquarters in Suryapet district